The Carters Run Rural Historic District encompasses a large rural landscape in central northern Fauquier County. The district also includes properties accessible from Scotts Road (County Road 719) and on the east side of Free State Road (County Road 721). Land use has for more than 200 years been almost entirely agricultural; there are no villages or commercial centers. The main structures in the district are farmhouses and agricultural outbuildings; the district notably includes the previously-listed Waveland plantation.

The district was listed on the National Register of Historic Places in 2014.

See also
National Register of Historic Places listings in Fauquier County, Virginia

References

Historic districts in Fauquier County, Virginia
National Register of Historic Places in Fauquier County, Virginia
Historic districts on the National Register of Historic Places in Virginia